Major-General Sir Neil Campbell CB (1 May 1776 – 14 August 1827) was a British Army officer who fought during the Napoleonic Wars, administered several British colonies, and escorted Napoleon Bonaparte into exile.

Biography
Born on 1 May 1776, Campbell was the son of a British Army officer.

Early career
In 1797, Campbell purchased his first commission in the Army as an ensign with a regiment stationed in the Turks and Caicos Islands. In 1799, Campbell purchased a lieutenancy.  In 1800, Campbell returned to England and joined a regiment of light troops there.  From February 1802 to September 1803, he attended the Royal Military College, then located at Great Marlow.  After his time at the college, Campbell became an assistant quartermaster-general.

In 1805, Campbell purchased a promotion to major in a regiment that spent two years in Jamaica.  After returning to England, Campbell purchased a promotion to lieutenant colonel.  Over the next three years, Campbell participated in the campaigns to capture Martinique, the Îles des Saintes, and Guadeloupe from the French.

War in Europe
Campbell returned to Britain in 1810 and in 1811 was seconded as a colonel in the Portuguese infantry, a post he held until 1813. In that year he was sent as a British military attaché to accompany the Russian Army. He was with the Russians when they invaded France in 1814. Campbell actively participated in fighting the French.  He was severely wounded on 25 March 1814 while leading a cavalry charge during the Battle of Fère-Champenoise when a Russian Cossack mistook him for a French officer.  Later in 1814, Campbell became a full colonel and in 1815 received a knighthood.

Exile of Napoleon and Waterloo
After the abdication of Napoleon in April 1814, Campbell was tasked with escorting him into exile on the Island of Elba and then heading the military detachment there.  Lord Castlereagh, Great Britain's foreign minister, had insisted that Napoleon be given complete freedom on the island.  On 26 February 1815, while Campbell was in Italy, Napoleon escaped Elba.  There were suspicions in England that Napoleon had bribed Campbell to allow his escape, but the foreign ministry did not fault Campbell in any way.

In 1815 Campbell served in the Waterloo Campaign and served as a commander of occupation forces in France until 1818.

Sierra Leone
Campbell was promoted to Major General in 1825 and was now able to apply for a staff appointment.  The first opportunity was as governor of Sierra Leone.  Due to the health hazards in that colony, Campbell's family asked him to turn down the assignment.  However, Campbell decided to go.

On 14 August 1827, Campbell died of an unknown disease in Sierra Leone and was buried in Circular Road Cemetery.

Notes

References

Further reading
 — A much more detailed biography

1776 births
1827 deaths
Recipients of the Waterloo Medal
British Army major generals
Companions of the Order of the Bath
Knights Bachelor
West India Regiment officers
67th Regiment of Foot officers
57th Regiment of Foot officers
43rd Regiment of Foot officers
54th Regiment of Foot officers
Portuguese military officers
British military personnel of the Napoleonic Wars